Augustine F. Heard II, also known as Augustine F. Heard Jr., (1827–1905) was an American Minister Resident and Consul General to Korea. He served from January 30, 1890, until June 27, 1893. He was born in Ipswich, Massachusetts. He was the nephew of Augustine Heard. He graduated from Harvard College in 1847. Upon the outbreak of the Sino-Japanese war in 1894, he supported a policy of international guarantee by the powers to keep Korea free from Japanese control.

See also
Ambassadors of the United States
Foreign relations of North Korea
Foreign relations of South Korea
North Korea–United States relations
South Korea–United States relations

References 

1827 births
1905 deaths
Harvard University alumni
People from Ipswich, Massachusetts
American consuls
Ambassadors of the United States to Korea